Stuart N. Brotman is an American government policymaker; university professor; management consultant; lawyer; author and editorial adviser; and non-profit organization executive. He has taught students from 42 countries in six separate disciplines — Communications, Journalism, Business, Law, International Relations and Public Policy. He also has advised private and public sector clients in more than 30 countries in five continents.

Biography

Education 

After graduating with a BS degree, summa cum laude, from Northwestern University, Brotman received his MA in communications from the University of Wisconsin-Madison and his JD from the University of California at Berkeley, where he served as note and comment editor of the California Law Review. He also completed advanced professional training in negotiation and mediation at Harvard Law School.

Academic appointments and fellowships 

Brotman is the inaugural Howard Distinguished Endowed Professor of Media Management and Law and Beaman Professor of Journalism and Electronic Media at the University of Tennessee, Knoxville. This interdisciplinary tenured position is the only one of its kind in the world. He has organized four semester-long graduate research seminars for the U.S. Department of State under the auspices of the University's Howard H. Baker Jr. Center for Public Policy, on big data and public diplomacy, social media and public diplomacy, global Internet freedom, and disinformation and storytelling. He also led a graduate student research team that served as Election Night social media analysts for Knoxville's CBS television affiliate, both in 2016 and 2018. Brotman serves on the Advisory Board of the Institute for Professional Leadership at the College of Law, as well.

Brotman is an appointed Fellow of the Woodrow Wilson Center for International Scholars in the 2019-20 academic year, focusing on digital privacy issues in its Science and Technology Innovation Program. He also is an honorary adjunct professor at the Jindal Global Law School in India, an affiliated researcher at the Media Management Transformation Centre of the Jönköping International Business School in Sweden, and a faculty member in the Chinese Executive Media Management Program at the University of Denver's Daniels College of Business.  During the 2012-13 academic year, he served as the inaugural Professor of Communication in Residence at Northwestern University in Qatar, teaching and conducting research on media law, policy, and ethics; global broadband development; Internet governance; and digital entrepreneurship. He taught students both in the Media Industries and Technologies Program of the School of Communication and in the Journalism Program of the Medill School of Journalism, Media and Integrated Marketing Communications. As the senior faculty member in communication, with full professor rank, he mentored 24 faculty members in both disciplines, as well. He also is a Fellow of the Salzburg Global Seminar, where he was a visiting scholar in its Academy on Media and Global Change.

Brotman served as the Fulbright-Nokia Distinguished Chair in Information and Communications Technologies in the Faculty of Social Sciences, Department of Social Research /Media and Communication Studies, at the University of Helsinki.  There were 40 Distinguished Chairs among the 800 faculty members in the Fulbright cohort during the 2012-13 academic year; he was the only appointee at this level in the field of communications and media. 
He held a professorial-level faculty appointment in international telecommunications law and policy at Tufts University's Fletcher School of Law and Diplomacy. He also chaired both the International Communications Committee and International Legal Education Committee of the American Bar Association's Section of International Law and Practice.

Brotman is a visiting professor of law at Harvard Law School, where he teaches entertainment and media law. He was the first Harvard Law School faculty member to teach telecommunications law. He also served as a faculty member in Harvard Law School's Institute for Global Law and Policy, and in the Harvard Business School Executive Education Program. He held the first concurrent appointment in digital media at Harvard and MIT, respectively at the Berkman Center for Internet & Society and the Program on Comparative Media Studies, and created the first study group on communications policymaking at the Harvard Kennedy School Institute of Politics. Brotman also serves as an annual visiting lecturer in entertainment and media law at Stanford Law School.

Brotman served as Matthew H. Fox-Century Fund Fellow in Law and Journalism at the National News Council. In that position, he worked closely with its first two Chairmen, Chief Justice Roger Traynor of the California Supreme Court and Chief Judge Stanley Fuld of the New York State Court of Appeals, in managing a complex docket of cases for deliberation by the Council 
as a whole. Brotman also served as an annual faculty lecturer for the Knight-Bagehot Fellowship Program in Economics and Business Journalism at the Columbia Journalism School. 
He served as a nonresident senior fellow in the Government Studies Program, Center for Technology Innovation, at The Brookings Institution. As a senior fellow at the Murrow Center for International Communications, he worked with an international team that advised the International Telecommunication Union and its foreign affiliates on regulatory issues related to new telecommunications technology and emerging media developments.

At the Boston University School of Law, Brotman served as a member of the nation's largest intellectual property law faculty, teaching the only advanced seminar on entertainment law offered at any American law school. He served as co-director of the joint J.D./M.S. program with the Boston University College of Communication. Under appointment by the United States Library of Congress, he also served as one of 50 intellectual property experts on the Copyright Arbitration Royalty Panel that was convened to resolve disputes regarding copyright fees to be paid by cable television companies to producers of film and video programming.

As a senior fellow of The Annenberg Washington Program in Communications Policy Studies, Brotman served as director of The Annenberg Washington Program's Winter Faculty Workshops on domestic and international communications. He also convened the key policy forum, and co-authored the major refereed article, that served as the basis for the U.S. Department of Justice identifying the key issues to be covered in its first comprehensive review of the Modification of Final Judgment that resulted from the AT&T divestiture Consent Decree.

At The Aspen Institute, Brotman served on the staff of its Communications and Society Program in Washington, DC, working on the Communications for Tomorrow research project funded by the Markle Foundation; as a Moderator for both the Aspen Institute Roundtable on International Telecommunications and executive seminars at Aspen Italia; and as a Senior Mentor of the Henry Crown Fellowship Program, advising a new generation of public-spirited business and government leaders.

He served as faculty director for the Leadership in Communication Program at the National Political Conventions, part of The Washington Center for Internships and Academic Seminars. In this capacity, he developed curriculum, supervised adjunct faculty, conducted seminars on political communication and the impact of emerging media on the electoral process. He mentored undergraduate and graduate students from select research universities, including the University of Pennsylvania, Minnesota, Purdue and USC. The program also included an integrated internship, with students placed and supervised at media organizations such as ‘’CNN’’, ‘’PBS’’, ‘’C-SPAN’’, ‘’Pioneer Press’’, ‘’Politico’’, ‘’Roll Call’’ and ‘’The Dallas Morning News.’’

He served as an information technology fellow at the Center for Strategic and International Studies in Washington, D.C. He also served as an Academic Fellow at Tel Aviv University's Jaffee Center for Strategic Studies, and as a Research Visitor at the University of Melbourne Law School's Centre for Media & Communications Law. In 2000, Brotman was named the first 
USA Telecommunications Eisenhower Fellow, based in Budapest, Hungary.

Public Policy Activities 

Brotman served two terms as an appointed member of the US Department of State Advisory Committee on International Communications and Information Policy (ACICIP), serving in an advisory capacity concerning major economic, social and legal issues and problems in international communications and information policy.  These issues and problems involve users and providers of information and communication services, technology research and development, foreign industrial and regulatory policy, and the activities of international organizations in communications and information.

Brotman served on the founding leadership team as Special Assistant to the President's principal communications policy adviser and Chief of Staff at the National Telecommunications and Information Administration (NTIA) in Washington, D.C., with 350 professionals in seven offices. In this capacity, he worked closely with the White House, Congress, the FCC, FTC, the U.S. Department of Justice, other Executive branch departments and independent agencies, and the research and academic community in developing durable models for telecommunications and information convergence.  He also had oversight responsibilities for the U.S. Commerce Department's Institute of Telecommunications Sciences, the federal government's R&D facility in Boulder, Colorado, which gave him frequent and extensive exposure to cutting-edge communication technology developments.

His work spanned a broad range of concerns, including broadcast, cable television and common carrier regulation and industry structure; home video and information services; public broadcasting; direct broadcast satellites; copyright; antitrust law; new communications technologies and programming sources; and federal and state communications legislation. He also served as NTIA's Project Manager for the four-volume contract research study, ‘’The Emergence of Pay Cable Television’’.

Brotman played a critical role in a range of transformative policy initiatives that have significant contemporary impact. He served as Co-Chair of the U.S. task force that recommended the introduction of direct broadcast satellites, and a s a member of the Working Group that developed policies to support the introduction of cellular telephone service in the United States. He served as Chair of the Legal Jurisdiction Subcommittee for the President's Task Force on Electronic Postal Policy, which ultimately persuaded the Executive Branch to foster e-mail as a competitive commercial service rather than as a government monopoly. He also was involved in drafting the first privacy legislation in both the financial services and health care fields, and in developing competitive benchmarks that were incorporated as part of the restructuring of the American telecommunications industry.

Brotman served as Matthew H. Fox-Century Fund Fellow in Law and Journalism at the National News Council.  In that position, he worked closely with its first two Chairmen, Chief Justice Roger Traynor of the California Supreme Court and Chief Judge Stanley Fuld of the New York State Court of Appeals, in managing a complex docket of cases for deliberation by the Council 
as a whole.

He testified before the Foreign Affairs Committee of the U.S. House of Representatives to support the creation of Radio Free Asia, which has emerged as a key public diplomacy resource for the United States.

He also served as a founding private sector member of the Board of Directors of the United States-Israel Science and Technology Foundation, which was created by President Clinton and Prime Minister Rabin. In 2002, Brotman was selected to serve as the Foundation's first American Chairman. During his tenure, the Foundation secured $6 million in funding commitments from the United States and broadened the Foundation's strategic innovation portfolio to encompass biotechnology, information technology, nanotechnology, the harmonization of technical standards, and technologies related to the enhancement of homeland security. Under his leadership, the Foundation established million-dollar grant programs to foster collaborative relationships between U.S. and Israeli companies in the life sciences, and to enable technology executives from both countries to visit their counterparts for extended periods of time.

The Museum of Television and Radio 

He also served as President and CEO of The Museum of Television & Radio, the premier trust of television and radio's heritage under his leadership. He oversaw all museum operations at its New York and Los Angeles locations, including a collection of 140,000 television and radio programs spanning more than 75 years and representing 70 countries; a staff of 140; a $60 million endowment and a $20 million annual budget. His personal engagement in development activities averaged $75,000 in new revenue on a weekly basis throughout his tenure.

His activities encompassed management; education; public and industry programming; curatorial and research services; communications and external relations; legal affairs; government relations; budget and finance; and development. He also served as a member of the Museum's Board of Trustees; Los Angeles Board of Governors; Media Center Board of Governors; and International Council Advisory Board.

At the Museum, he moved aggressively to make major strides in transitioning from a bi-coastal 20th century museum to a 21st-century institution with global reach. During his tenure, more Museum seminars were aired nationally on C-SPAN annually than ever before. The Museum also achieved record-setting levels of feature coverage both in ‘’The New York Times’’ and ‘’Los Angeles Times’’. Along with the Metropolitan Museum of Art and The Museum of Modern Art, The Museum of Television & Radio was selected to be the subject of a documentary produced by WNYC as part of its Blueprint series, honoring significant New York cultural institutions.

Under Brotman's leadership, the Museum joined forces with a variety of leading academic, cultural and industry organizations in cooperative programming activities, all at a level unprecedented in the Museum's history. Among the organizations that forged new relationships were The Brooklyn Academy of Music; Council on Foreign Relations; The Peabody Awards; The International Academy of Television Arts & Sciences; The Recording Academy; The Cable Center; The Center for Communications; The Rock and Roll Hall of Fame; Harvard Law School's Berkman Center for Internet & Society; the Graduate School of Journalism at the University of California, Berkeley; the USC Annenberg School For Communications; the Writers Guild of America; The Directors Guild of America; The Directors Guild of America; and the International Documentary Association. The Museum also deepened it focus on China, including special invitational programs on China and the Internet and the development of the Chinese media market.

Management Consulting and Law Practice 

Brotman also serves as president of Stuart N. Brotman Communications, a global management consulting firm, with clients in over 30 countries. He is a senior adviser in telecommunications, Internet, media, entertainment and sports. He has worked on $150 billion of mergers and acquisitions, and as an expert witness in litigation matters totaling over $2 billion.

He has served as counsel to two major international law firms, Winthrop, Stimson, Putnam & Roberts (now Pillsbury Winthrop Shaw Pittman), where he founded the Communications, Information and Entertainment Practice Group and practiced both in Brussels and London, and at Morrison & Foerster.

Among the clients he represented in private practice were Rolls-Royce, for whom he handled transnational data protection and privacy matters; Sweden Telecom, which he counseled on cellular telephone licensing negotiations in Vietnam; MCI, which he advised on the telecommunications provisions of the North American Free Trade Agreement; and Korea Telecom, which he represented during the Uruguay GATT round that led to the creation of the World Trade Organization.

Brotman also serves as an appointed arbitrator and mediator at the World Intellectual Property Organization in Geneva, Switzerland, among a group of 1,500 neutrals from 70 countries. The subject matter of these proceedings includes patent licenses, software licenses, distribution agreements for pharmaceutical products, and research and development agreements, as well as patent infringement, trademark co-existence agreements, copyright issues, art marketing agreements and entertainment contracts.

Professional Affiliations, Honors and Awards 

Was named the first USA Telecommunications Eisenhower Fellow in 2000, based in Budapest, Hungary.  
Serves as a director of the Telecommunications Policy Research Institute and on the Board of the Future of Privacy Forum.
Serves on the First Amendment Advisory Council of The Media Institute.
Served as chairman of the American Bar Association's International Communications Law Committee. 
Served on the boards of the Berkeley Law Alumni Association, the Museum of Television & Radio 
Served on the editorial advisory boards of the ‘’Berkeley Technology Law Journal’’, ‘’Federal Communications Law Journal’’, the ‘’Journal of Biolaw & Business’’, and the ‘’Journal of Science & Technology Law’’
Served as a senior mentor of the Henry Crown Fellowship Program at the Aspen Institute
Is an elected member of the Academy of Television Arts & Sciences and the National Press Club 
Is an honorary member of the China Broadcasters Association—the first American to be named for this honor
Received the Northwestern University Alumni Merit Award for distinguished professional achievement 
Received the Distinguished Alumnus Award in Communications from the University of Wisconsin-Madison
Brotman is the only two-time recipient of Lifetime Achievement Awards from the Broadcast Education Association in Law and Policy (2014) and in Scholarship (2016)   
He is a member of the bars of the State of California, the Supreme Court of the United States, the US Court of Appeals for the District of Columbia Circuit, the US District Court for the Central District of California, the American Bar Association and the Federal Communications Bar Association

Publications 

Brotman has written over 300 articles and reviews on business, technology, policy, history, negotiation, law, regulation and international trade that have appeared in scholarly and professional publications, including ‘’Bloomberg’s Businessweek’’, ‘’The Boston Globe’’, ‘’Broadcasting’’, ‘’Cable Communications Magazine’’, ‘’Chicago Tribune’’, ‘’The Christian Science Monitor’’, ‘’Communications Week’’, ‘’Electronic Media’’, ‘’Forbes’’, ‘’Journal of Communication’’, ‘’Legal Times’’, ‘’Los Angeles Times’’, MIT Technology Review, Multichannel News, The National Law Journal, The New York Times, U.S. News & World Report, The Wilson Quarterly and The Washington Post.

He is the editor of: 
‘’The Telecommunications Deregulation Sourcebook’’, a reference volume covering the broadcasting, cable television and telephone industries
‘’Telephone Company and Cable Television Competition’’, an anthology dealing with technical, economic and regulatory aspects of broadband networks
and the author of: 
‘’Broadcasters Can Negotiate Anything’’,
‘’Communications Law and Practice’’,  the leading treatise covering domestic and international telecommunications and electronic mass media regulation. This treatise originally was developed in 1995. A year later, after the 1996 Telecommunications Act became law, it had to be significantly revised to reflect the dramatic new changes that had occurred. Since then, Brotman has written two updated editions every year—which is equivalent to 23 books over a 23-year time span. It continues to be utilized by generations of law students around the country, housed in leading law libraries at institutions such as Harvard, Yale, Stanford, Columbia, University of Chicago, University of Virginia, and Georgetown University. Available through LexisNexis, it has also been cited widely as an authoritative source in briefs filed before federal appellate courts, including the U.S. Supreme Court. In 1998, the treatise also was added to the Vatican Library as the only American communications law reference work in its collection.

Brotman is a frequent analyst for leading newspapers and magazines, including ‘’Fortune’’, ‘’Los Angeles Times’’, ‘’The New York Times, Time’’, and ‘’The Wall Street Journal’’. He also has provided expert commentary for ABC's ‘’World News This Morning’’, NBC's ‘’Today Show’’ and NPR's ‘’Morning Edition’’. He appears as a featured speaker at major academic and industry conferences in North America, Europe, Asia, Australia, Latin America and the Middle East.

References

Living people
American management consultants
American lawyers
American business writers
Fulbright Distinguished Chairs
University of Wisconsin–Madison School of Journalism & Mass Communication alumni
Year of birth missing (living people)
People associated with Morrison & Foerster